St. Sebastian's Church, Negombo may refer to:

 St. Sebastian's Church, Wellaweediya
 St. Sebastian's Church, Katuwapitiya

See also